Nyamityobora Football Club, also Nyamityobora FC, is a football club based in Mbarara, in the Western Region of Uganda.

History
Nyamityobora played in the Uganda Premier League for the 2018–19 season following their promotion from winning the FUFA Big League Rwenzori Division in the 2017/2018 Ugandan football season. They won the western regional league playoffs in 2016. They were relegated after only one season in the top flight.

The club contests the Mbarara derby against Mbarara City FC, who they beat for their first-ever victory in the top flight.

References

External links
 Nyamityobora FC captain Muganga on radar of three clubs As of 1 July 2018.
 Kizza hat-trick spurs Nyamityobora to massive victory away to Greater Masaka As of May 2018.
Nyamityobora FC Seeks UGX 240M Funding

 Football clubs in Uganda